Abitusavis (meaning "departure bird") is an extinct genus of ornithuromorphs from the Early Cretaceous Yixian Formation of China. The genus contains a single species, Abitusavis lii, known from a nearly complete skeleton.

References 

Prehistoric euornitheans
Early Cretaceous birds of Asia
Yixian fauna
Fossil taxa described in 2020
Birds described in 2020